Torgeir Andreas Berge (17 February 1897 – 30 April 1973) was a Norwegian farmer and politician for the Labour Party from Sandar. He represented Vestfold for three periods in the Parliament of Norway from 1950 to 1961. Prior to that, he sat in the municipal council of Sandar from 1945 to 1955. He was chairman of Statskog from 1957 to 1969 and board member of Norges Kooperative Landsforening from 1949 to 1963. Berge was born in Fusa.

References

Labour Party (Norway) politicians
Members of the Storting
Vestfold politicians
People from Sandefjord
People from Fusa
1897 births
1973 deaths
20th-century Norwegian politicians